Munawwar Qari Abdurrashidkhan ogli (Cyrillic Мунаввар Қори Абдурашидхон ўғли; Arabic name ) (*1878 in Tashkent; † 1931) was a leading Jadidist of late Tsarist Turkestan. Like other Jadids, Munnawwar Qari worked as author, poet, teacher, journalist and in other occupations.

Life
Munawwar Qari was the youngest child in a family of Islamic scholars and received his education in Tashkent and Bukhara. In 1901, he opened Tashkent's first Maktab to follow the Jadids new method of teaching. He also wrote textbooks for use in schools and published literary works of other authors, while publishing and editing The Sun, one of the first independent newspapers in Russian Turkestan.

After the Russian Revolution, he continued working as a teacher, but was arrested and deported to a Gulag camp in 1925 and shot in 1931 after being convicted for "counter-revolutionary activities". His grave can be found in Moscow's Yagankovo cemetery.

See also
Mahmudkhodja Behbudiy

Literature
 Adeeb Khalid: 'The Politics of Muslim Cultural Reform: Jadidism in Central Asia, Berkeley 1998.
 Charles Kurzman: Modernist Islam, 1840–1940. A Sourcebook, New York 2002, p. 227.
 Edward Allworth: Central Asia. 120 Years of Russian Rule'', London 1989.

References 

Jadids
Uzbek Soviet Socialist Republic people
Uzbekistani journalists
Soviet journalists
Uzbekistani publishers (people)
Soviet publishers (people)
Uzbekistani writers
Soviet writers
1878 births
1931 deaths
Soviet Muslims
People executed by the Soviet Union by firearm